The 2020–21 Ukrainian Basketball SuperLeague was the 2020–21 edition of the Ukrainian top-tier basketball championship. Dnipro were the defending champions. The season started on 7 October 2020 and ended 14 June 2021.

This season marked the debut season of BC Ternopil. Prometey won its first-ever Ukrainian league title.

Teams 

The league was expanded to 11 teams, as Ternopil will made its debut.

Regular season

Standings

Playoffs

Ukrainian clubs in European competitions

References

External links
Official Ukrainian Basketball Federation website

Ukrainian Basketball SuperLeague seasons
1
Ukraine